Emil Ludvig Peter Jørgensen (7 February 1882 in Gentofte – 23 March 1947 in Gentofte) was a Danish amateur football player and administrator. He played four games for the Denmark national football team, and won a silver medal at the 1912 Summer Olympics.

Biography
Jørgensen was an energetic and strong half back, with a knack for going on the offensive to shoot from the distance. He represented Danish clubs ØB and B 93.

He made his Danish national team debut in October 1911. He was part of the Danish team, which won the silver medal in the football tournament of the 1912 Summer Olympics. He had trouble getting the days off at his everyday workplace in the Copenhagen tax office, so Jørgensen missed the first Danish game of the tournament. He played two matches in the tournament, and scored one goal as Denmark defeated the Netherlands 4-1 in the semi-final. Jørgensen and Denmark lost the final to Great Britain. His last international game came in October 1912, and all in all, Jørgensen played four games and scored one goal for Denmark.

With B 93, he won the club's first Danish football championship in 1916. He ended his career in 1917, having played 115 games and scored 11 goals for B 93 since his debut in 1901. During his active career, Jørgensen took the job of unpaid secretary of the Copenhagen Football Association in 1915, a position he kept until his death in 1947.

References

1882 births
1947 deaths
Danish men's footballers
Denmark international footballers
Boldklubben af 1893 players
Footballers at the 1912 Summer Olympics
Olympic footballers of Denmark
Olympic silver medalists for Denmark
Olympic medalists in football
Medalists at the 1912 Summer Olympics
Association football midfielders